The Campeonato de Fútbol Femenino de Primera División C, also known as the Tercera División Femenina, is the third-highest division of women's football in Argentina. It was founded in 2019, after the foundation of 16 new teams to the division which is run by the Argentine Football Association. Unión were included also.

Champions

Titles by club

Notes

References

2019 establishments in Argentina
Football leagues in Argentina
Sports leagues established in 2019
Argentina 3
Women's football in Argentina
Women's sports leagues in Argentina